Echolocation is the debut album by American folk-rock band Fruit Bats, released in 2001.

Track listing
All songs by Eric D. Johnson.
"The Old Black Hole" – 5:04
"Glass in Your Feet" – 3:52
"Buffalo and Deer" – 5:14
"Need It Just a Little" – 4:57
"Black Bells (Make Me Ok)" – 4:28
"Strange Little Neck of the Woods" – 3:51 
"Echolocation Stomp" – 0:47
"Coal Age" – 2:24
"Filthy Water" – 5:07
"A Dodo Egg" – 5:37
"Dragon Ships" – 5:51
"Blue Parachute" – 2:46

References

Fruit Bats (band) albums
2001 debut albums